Up Pops Ramsey Lewis is an album by pianist Ramsey Lewis which was issued in February 1968 on Cadet Records. The album reached No. 25 on the Billboard Top Soul Albums chart.

Reception

Allmusic awarded the album 2 stars.

Track listing
 "Soul Man" (David Porter, Isaac Hayes) - 2:50   
 "The Look of Love" (Burt Bacharach, Hal David) - 4:22   
 "Respect" (Otis Redding) - 3:00   
 "Goin' Out of My Head" (Teddy Randazzo, Bobby Weinstein) - 3:42   
 "Party Time" (Richard Evans) - 3:40   
 "Bear Mash" (Evans) - 3:00   
 "I Was Made to Love Her" (Henry Cosby, Sylvia Moy, Lula Mae Hardaway, Stevie Wonder) - 3:15   
 "Alfie" (Bacharach, David) - 2:45   
 "Why Am I Treated So Bad" (Roebuck Staples) - 2:50   
 "Jade East" (Evans) - 3:25

Personnel 
Ramsey Lewis - piano
Cleveland Eaton - bass
Maurice White  - drums
Orchestra arranged and conducted by Richard Evans

References 

1967 albums
Ramsey Lewis albums
Cadet Records albums